Pasamulla Pandiyare is a 1997 Indian Tamil-language action drama film directed by T. P. Gajendran and produced by Kalyani Murugan. The film stars Rajkiran, Meena, and Roja, while M. N. Nambiar, Nizhalgal Ravi, Alex, Sangili Murugan, Vadivelu, and Senthil play supporting roles. It was released on 6 June 1997.

Plot 

Pandiyar is a genuine person adopted by Nesamani's family. The family migrates to Malaysia, leaving the house under Pandiyar and other properties under Eswaramoorthi. Vellayamma is a talented palm reader who falls for Pandiyar. Nesamani's daughter Dhanalakshmi returns to India with her husband Nagaraja and daughter Revathi. Revathi falls in love with Pandiyar. Vellayamma reads Dhanalakshmi's palm and finds her untold secret story. Then, Nagaraja kills Vellayamma's associates with Eswaramoorthi, and the innocent man Pandiyar gets arrested for Vellayamma's murder. The rest of the story revolves around how Pandiyar proves his innocence at court.

Cast 

Rajkiran as Pandiyar
Meena as Vellayamma
Roja as Revathi
M. N. Nambiar as Nesamani
Nizhalgal Ravi as Nagaraja
Alex as Eswaramoorthi
Sangili Murugan as Isakki, Pandiyar's father
Vadivelu as Kuppusamy
Senthil as Appusamy
Mahanadi Shankar
Kovai Sarala
Fathima Babu
Monica
Idichapuli Selvaraj
Kullamani
K. K. Soundar
Peeli Sivam
Jyothi Lakshmi in a special appearance
V. Gopalakrishnan in a guest appearance
Ram Lakshman (stunt choreographers) as chained mental patients

Soundtrack 
The soundtrack was composed by Deva.

Reception 
Ji of Kalki felt it was hard that the story does not move until the intermission, and then the plot which moves becomes difficult, yet he praised Fathima Babu's performance, saying she manages but was critical of her makeup, he dismissed Deva's music as nothing great. He concluded the review by saying Gajendran could have kept at least four special features in the film.

References

External links 
 

1990s action drama films
1990s Tamil-language films
1997 films
Films directed by T. P. Gajendran
Films scored by Deva (composer)
Indian action drama films